Jon Douglas Levenson is an American Hebrew Bible scholar who is the Albert A. List Professor of Jewish Studies at the Harvard Divinity School.

Education
A.B. summa cum laude in English, Harvard College, 1971.
A.M. Department of Near Eastern Languages and Civilizations, Harvard University, 1974.
Ph.D. Department of Near Eastern Languages and Civilizations, Harvard University, 1975.

Areas of specialization
Levenson is a scholar of the Bible and of the rabbinic midrash, with an interest in the philosophical and theological issues involved in biblical studies.  He studies the  relationship between traditional  modes of Biblical interpretation and modern historical criticism.  He also studies  the relationship between Judaism and Christianity.

Levenson's foci include: Theological traditions in ancient Israel (biblical and rabbinic periods); Literary Interpretation of the Hebrew Bible; Midrash; History of Jewish biblical interpretation; Modern Jewish theology; and Jewish-Christian relations. His 1987 essay, Why Jews Are Not Interested in Biblical Theology essay, challenged the fields of historical criticism and Biblical theology as they had been practiced and has been widely discussed.

Levenson has been called, “the most interesting and incisive biblical exegete among contemporary Jewish thinkers.” He is described as “challenging the idea, part of Greek philosophy and popular now, that resurrection for Jews and the followers of Jesus is simply the survival of an individual's soul in the hereafter.”  In Resurrection and the Restoration of Israel, Levenson asserts that in classical Christianity and Judaism,”  “resurrection occurs for the whole person — body and soul. For early Christians and some Jews, resurrection meant being given back one's body or possibly God creating a new similar body after death”.   He is a member of the Editorial Board of the Jewish Review of Books.

In the late 1990s his body of work as of that time was reviewed by Marvin A. Sweeney and put in the larger context of the field of biblical theology; Sweeney wrote: "A great deal of his work focuses on the seminal question of identifying the role that Christian theological constructs have played in the reading of biblical literature, even when the reading is presented as historically based objective scholarship, and of developing reading strategies that can remove these constructs in order to let the biblical texts 'speak for themselves.' Work of this kind naturally paves the way for the development of Jewish biblical theology."

Prizes and honors
 Biblical Archaeology Society Publication Award in the category of Best Book Relating to the Hebrew Bible published in 2005 or 2006 (for Resurrection and the Restoration of Israel), awarded August 2007
 Doctorate in Divinity, honoris causa, from St. Mary's Seminary and University, Baltimore, Maryland, awarded May 10, 2007
 National Jewish Book Award (for Resurrection and the Restoration of Israel), 2006, awarded in March 2007
 Henry R. Luce III Senior Fellowship in Theology, 1999–2000

Books

Employment
 Albert A. List Professor of Jewish Studies, The Divinity School, Harvard University, 1988-
 Affiliate Member, Department of Near Eastern Languages and Civilizations, Harvard University, 1988-
 Professor of Hebrew Bible in the Divinity School and in the Committee on General Studies in the Humanities, the University of Chicago, 1988
 Associate Professor of Hebrew Bible in the Divinity School and in the Committee on General Studies in the Humanities, the University of Chicago, 1986–88
 Associate Professor of Hebrew Bible in the Divinity School, the University of Chicago, 1982–86
 Assistant Professor of Religion and Biblical Studies, Wellesley College, 1975–82

Notes

References

External links 

Year of birth missing (living people)
Living people
Jewish biblical scholars
Jewish American academics
American biblical scholars
Old Testament scholars
Harvard Divinity School faculty
Harvard College alumni
Wellesley College faculty
20th-century Jewish biblical scholars
21st-century Jewish biblical scholars
21st-century American Jews